Metarctia pumila is a moth of the subfamily Arctiinae. It was described by George Hampson in 1909. It is found in Eritrea, Ethiopia, Sudan, Uganda and possibly the Democratic Republic of the Congo.

References

 

Metarctia
Moths described in 1909